Robert Ray Scott (November 1, 1920 – October 3, 2006) was a career officer in the United States Air Force, who flew combat missions in World War II, Korean War and Vietnam War.

Early life
Scott was born at Des Moines, Iowa, on 1920 to Ray Scott and Elva M. Scott. After graduating from North High School in Des Moines in January 1939, he studied aeronautical engineering at the University of Iowa for two years.

Military career
On August 15, 1941, he enlisted in the Aviation Cadet Program of the U.S. Army Air Corps, and was commissioned as a Second Lieutenant and earned his pilot wings on 16 March 1942. Afterwards, he was assigned as an instructor pilot at Victorville Army Air Field in California, from March 1942 to January 1944. At this time, he was promoted to First Lieutenant.

World War II
In January 1944, he was assigned as a P-61 Black Widow night fighter pilot with the 426th Night Fighter Squadron. Initially stationed at Hammer Field and Delano Airport in California, the squadron moved to British India on 29 June and later to China on 9 August, where the squadron and their detachments were deployed and flew missions from airfields in the Chinese provinces of Sichuan, Yunnan and Shaanxi. During his time with the 426th NFS, Scott was credited in destroying two Japanese aircraft in aerial combat and was awarded the Distinguished Flying Cross and the Air Medal.
He was promoted to Captain on May 3, 1944, and to Major on August 16, 1945.

Cold war
After the end of the war, Scott served as an advisor to the Republic of China Air Force and an instructor with Air University at Maxwell Air Force Base in Alabama, from September 1947 to August 1948. In January 1951, he graduated with a bachelor's and master's degree from Iowa State University after receiving an Air Force Institute of Technology assignment to do so.

From July 1952 to October 1952, served as an F-86D Sabre Dog project officer with Air Proving Ground Command at Eglin Air Force Base.

After completing Fighter Bomber Escort Training at Nellis Air Force Base in Nevada in February 1953, Scott was as an F-86 Sabre pilot with the 8th Fighter-Bomber Group in February 1953 and was appointed as commander of the 35th Fighter-Bomber Squadron in April 1953, during the Korean War. Stationed at Suwon Air Base in South Korea, he flew 117 missions during the war and was awarded the Silver Star on July 18, 1953, during an interdiction mission against an enemy airfield in Sinuiju, North Korea, his aircraft was hit by heavy anti-aircraft fire which caused extreme damage to the fuselage. Although fully realizing the nature and seriousness of the damage, he still initiated his attack through intense anti-aircraft and automatic weapons fire with maximum damage was inflicted upon the target with a minimum loss to the squadron. Despite the crippled condition of his aircraft, he regrouped his squadron and led it safely through dangerous weather conditions back to the base. In October 1953, he was appointed as executive officer of the 8th Fighter-Bomber Group.

After returning to the United States in December 1953, he was appointed as commander of the 510th Fighter-Bomber Squadron at Langley Air Force Base in Virginia, where he flew the F-84 Thunderjet.

On October 9, 1955, Scott set a transcontinental speed record by flying a Republic F-84F Thunderstreak fighter bomber from Los Angeles International Airport to Floyd Bennett Field in New York, in 3 hours, 46 minutes, 33.6 seconds. Later he was a project officer at Edwards Air Force Base on the Republic F-105 Thunderchief.

In 1966, Scott participated in the Vietnam War, as the commander of the 355th Tactical Fighter Wing at Takhli Royal Thai Air Force Base in Thailand, and flew a full tour of bombing and fighter missions over North Vietnam, while flying the F-105 Thunderchief. He was credited in destroying a North Vietnamese Air Force MiG-17 on March 26, 1967, during an attack against an enemy military barracks near Hanoi, making him only the second U.S. Air Force pilot, after Colonel Robin Olds, to achieve aerial victories during World War II and the Vietnam War. He flew a total of 134 missions during the war.

He was appointed as commander of the 832nd Air Division at Cannon Air Force Base in New Mexico in September 1967. He retired from the Air Force on 1970.

Later life
After his retirement from the Air Force, he worked for Fairchild Industries and later as vice-president for operations and chief pilot for Antilles International Airlines until retirement at the age of 60. After his complete retirement, he worked as a cattle rancher in New Mexico and California.
 
Scott died on October 3, 2006, at the age of 85, in	Tehachapi, California. He was buried at Arlington National Cemetery.

Awards and decorations
During his lengthy career, Scott earned many decorations, including:

See also
Robin Olds

References

1920 births
2006 deaths
United States Air Force personnel of the Korean War
United States Air Force personnel of the Vietnam War
Recipients of the Silver Star
Recipients of the Legion of Merit
Recipients of the Distinguished Flying Cross (United States)
Recipients of the Air Medal
Order of National Security Merit members
People from Des Moines, Iowa
Military personnel from Iowa
Aviators from Iowa
American aviation record holders
Burials at Arlington National Cemetery
People from Kern County, California
American Korean War pilots
American Vietnam War pilots
United States Army Air Forces pilots of World War II
Iowa State University alumni
United States Air Force colonels